Robert Abraham (1773–1850) was an English building surveyor and later architect in London. He was the son of a builder and was educated as a surveyor as a pupil of James Bowen.  He turned to architecture after 1818, and was chiefly employed by the leading Roman Catholic families in England, including the Duke of Norfolk and the Earl of Shrewsbury.

He was respected by his patrons principally for his reliability, but he was competent in the various styles fashionable at the period. He was married to Eliza Brown (died 1818), an accomplished flower-painter, and their son H. R. Abraham succeeded to his practice when he died on 11 December 1850.  His eldest daughter (Ellinor Mary) married Richard Bethell, Lord Westbury, who served as Lord Chancellor in 1861-1865. Another daughter (Louisa Sarah) married John Bethell.

Among Abraham's students was the architect James Lockyer who went on to form his own successful London practice.

List of works
Wealdstone (Middlesex): Kenton Lane Farm, new buildings for William Loudon, ca. 1808; demolished
Pinner (Middlesex): Woodhall Farm, remodelling for William Loudon, ca. 1808-1809
Arundel Castle (Sussex): completed rebuilding of east wing (begun by James Teasdale) for Charles Howard, the 11th Duke of Norfolk, ca. 1810-1815
Rise Hall (Yorkshire): attributed alterations, 1815–1820
Westminster (Middlesex): County Fire Office, Regent Street, 1819; demolished 1924
Westminster (Middlesex): 176-186 Regent Street, for J. Carbonell, wine merchant, 1820; demolished
Westminster (Middlesex): Norfolk House, St. James's Square, alterations for Bernard Howard, the 12th Duke of Norfolk, 1819–1820; demolished 1938
Westminster (Middlesex): Craven Chapel, Foubert's Place, 1821–1822
Mildenhall (Wiltshire): School, 1823–1824
Fornham Hall (Suffolk): alterations for Bernard Howard, 12th Duke of Norfolk, ca. 1824; demolished ca. 1951
Alton Towers (Staffordshire): garden buildings for Charles Talbot, the 15th Earl of Shrewsbury, ca. 1825-1827
Hayling Island (Hampshire): building development for William Padwick, after 1825
Westminster (Middlesex): Western Synagogue, St. Alban's Place, 1827–1828
Tooting (Surrey): National Schools, 1829–1830
Worksop Manor (Nottinghamshire): works and gardener's cottage for the Earl of Surrey (who was Henry Howard, the 13th Duke of Norfolk), ca. 1830
Tothill Fields Bridewell, Westminster (Middlesex), 1830–1834; demolished 1885
Hull (Yorkshire): School of Medicine, Kingston Square, 1833
Harlow (Essex): Fawbert and Barnard's School, 1836
Westminster (Middlesex): Oxford Street, houses on the Berners estate, 1836
Thame Park (Oxfordshire): restoration of medieval chapel for Baroness Wenman, 1836
Arundel (Sussex): Town Hall, for Bernard Howard, the 12th Duke of Norfolk, 1836
Arundel (Sussex): Trinity Congregational Church, Tarrant Street, 1836–1838
London: College of Arms, Queen Victoria Street, interior of the Record Room, 1842–1844
Cheltenham (Gloucestershire): Unitarian Church, Bayshill Road, 1844

References

Colvin, Sir H. A biographical dictionary of British architects, 1995, pp. 47–48

1773 births
19th-century English architects
1850 deaths